Doddarasinakere  is a village in the southern state of Karnataka, India. It is located in the Maddur taluk of Mandya district in Karnataka.

Etymology 
The name Doddarasinakere has its roots from King Doddarasaru.

Demographics
 India census, Doddarasinakere had a population of 9392 with 4824 males and 4568 females.

Notable People
 Ambareesh - actor and politician
D. C. Tammanna - former Minister in the government of Karnataka

See also
 Mandya
 Districts of Karnataka

References

External links
 http://Mandya.nic.in/

Villages in Mandya district